Bennie Samuel Swain (December 16, 1933 – June 19, 2008) was an American professional basketball player.

A 6'8" forward/center, Swain played at Texas Southern University in the 1950s. He led the NAIA in scoring during the 1957-58 season and was named an NAIA All-American. After graduating, Swain was selected by the Boston Celtics with the eighth pick of the 1958 NBA Draft.  He played one season for the Celtics, contributing 4.6 points and 4.5 rebounds per game en route to the 1959 NBA Championship. 

He was the first Texas Southern University player to earn an NBA Championship ring.

Swain later served as a high school basketball coach.

Notes

External links
Career statistics
Ex-TSU All-American Swain, 78, dies

1933 births
2008 deaths
All-American college men's basketball players
American men's basketball players
Basketball players from Alabama
Boston Celtics draft picks
Boston Celtics players
Deaths from cancer in Texas
People from Talladega, Alabama
Power forwards (basketball)
Texas Southern Tigers men's basketball players